13 Stories and 13 Epitaphs is a book of short stories written by William T. Vollmann first published in the UK in 1991. The stories, which are both fictional and semi-autobiographical, traverse a wide range of themes and are punctuated by short mediations on death.

References 

Works by William T. Vollmann
1991 short story collections
André Deutsch books